Clanculus rarus is a species of sea snail, a marine gastropod mollusk in the family Trochidae, the top snails.

The description by Dufo was miserable and doesn't allow an undisputed definition. Paul Fischer (1835-1893) suggested that it should be relegated to the synonymy of Clanculus pharaonius.

Description
The size of the shell attains 12 mm.

Distribution
This marine species occurs in the Indian Ocean off the Mascarene basin.

References

 Herbert, D. G. 1991. New records of Mollusca from southern Africa and Mozambique. Part 1. (Mollusca: Gastropoda). Annals of the Natal Museum 32: 305–318. page(s): 308

External links
 Ph. Dautzenberg, Liste des Mollusques Marins de France provenant des îlesGlorieuses; Société des sciences naturelles de l'Ouest de France t.5 (1895)
 

rarus
Gastropods described in 1840